Jennifer Blake may refer to:

 Jennifer Blake (author), pseudonym used by American romantic novelist Patricia Maxwell (born 1942)
 Jennifer Blake (wrestler) (born 1983), Canadian wrestler
 Jennifer R. Blake, American actress
Jennifer Blake, pseudonym of Dieter Bohlen (born 1954), German producer and ex-member of Modern Talking